Colonel Sir John Callander, 1st Baronet (September 1739 – 2 April 1812) was a Scottish soldier and politician.

Callander was the son of Alexander Callander, of Westertown, Stirlingshire, and Margaret Ramsay, daughter of David Ramsay. He was a Colonel in the British Army and also sat as Member of Parliament for Berwick-upon-Tweed from 1795 to 1802 and again from 1806 to 1807. In 1798 he was created a baronet, of Westertown in the County of Stirling and of Crichton and Preston Hall and Elphinstone in the Counties of East and Mid Lothian.

Callander married Margaret Romer, daughter of John Romer, of Cherwick, Northumberland, and widow of Bridges Kearney, in 1786. The marriage was childless. He died in April 1812 when the baronetcy became extinct. Lady Callander died in September 1815.

References

1739 births
1812 deaths
Baronets in the Baronetage of Great Britain
Members of the Parliament of Great Britain for English constituencies
British MPs 1790–1796
British MPs 1796–1800
Members of the Parliament of the United Kingdom for English constituencies
UK MPs 1801–1802
UK MPs 1806–1807